Sławomir Wojciechowski (born 6 September 1973 in Gdańsk) is a Polish former professional footballer who played as a midfielder.

Honours
 Bundesliga: 2000–01
 DFB-Pokal: 1999–2000
 DFB-Ligapokal: 2000
 UEFA Champions League: 2000–01

References

External links
 

1973 births
Living people
Sportspeople from Gdańsk
Polish footballers
Association football midfielders
Poland international footballers
Ekstraklasa players
Bundesliga players
Lechia Gdańsk players
Zawisza Bydgoszcz players
GKS Katowice players
FC Aarau players
FC Bayern Munich footballers
RKS Radomsko players
FC Viktoria Köln players
Olimpia Grudziądz players